Chasing Lights is the debut album by British-Irish girl group The Saturdays. It was released in the United Kingdom through Fascination Records on 27 October 2008. The album was re-issued on 16 March 2009 to include their cover of Depeche Mode's 1981 song "Just Can't Get Enough".

Production
The Saturdays started production of their debut album in May 2008. They were offered the chance to record songs that were rejected by Girls Aloud, with whom they shared a record label. Their music is often compared to that of Girls Aloud and Sugababes. Band member Mollie King told the Daily Star, "We all thought it was a bit of a cheek. Why would we want their rejects? ... It's bad enough with all the comparisons being made". The last track of Chasing Lights, "Why Me, Why Now", was originally a demo that was written and recorded by Alex Cartana but was later picked up by The Saturdays. The members of The Saturdays have no writing credits on the record but they do have writing credits on their subsequent albums.

Reception

Critical response 
Chasing Lights received a positive reception from music critics. Digital Spy called it a "consistently enjoyable debut album and said, "Their sassy, modern, chart-ready pop is more straightforward than most Girls Aloud singles and younger than the music Sugababes are now recording. The world, or at least the top ten, should be their oyster."

Some critics referred to Chasing Lights as "a definite contender for pop album of the year". The album was number four on Popjustice's 2008 year-end chart of the best albums.

Commercial performance 
In the UK, Chasing Lights debuted at number eleven while in Ireland it debuted at number forty-nine. By April 2009, the album reached number thirty-four in Ireland. The album climbed from number fourteen to number nine in the UK on 25 January 2009. The album was certified Platinum in the UK on 6 November 2009.

Singles 

 "If This Is Love", which was released digitally on 27 July 2008, is the album's lead single. It was released commercially in the UK on 28 July for digital and physical distribution, peaked at number eight on the UK Singles Chart and became their first top-ten hit.
 "Up", which was released digitally on 12 October 2008, is the album's second single. It was released commercially in the UK on 13 October for digital and physical distribution. The song peaked at number five on the UK Singles Chart, becoming their second consecutive top-ten hit, and debuted at number eleven on the Irish Singles Chart. "Up" is the group's debut single in Brazil. "Up" is also used as dubbed over theme song for the 19th annual edition of WWE pay-per-view SummerSlam in 2006, replacing both original theme songs "Cobrastyle" by Teddybears featuring Mad Cobra and "The Enemy" by Godsmack - which was used from SummerSlam: The Complete Anthology Vol. 4 Disc 19 DVD on WWE Home Video released on 5 August 2008 and not to feature dubbing from the original version on WWE Network.
 "Issues", released officially on 5 January 2009, is the album's third single. It was released commercially in the UK on 5 January after spending a few weeks in the top forty. The song hit number six on the UK Singles Chart and became their third consecutive top ten hit. The following week it climbed to number four.
 "Just Can't Get Enough", a non-album single, was released on 2 March 2009. The song entered the UK Singles Chart at number two on 8 March 2009, second to Flo Rida's "Right Round". On the Irish Singles Chart, the song debuted at number seventeen. The following week, it climbed to number nine and peaked at number six. It became their first top-ten and highest-charting single to date in Ireland.
 "Work" was announced in January 2009 as the fifth single to be released from the album. It was a fan-favourite since the release of the album, and it was released in the UK on 29 June 2009 and peaked on the UK Singles Chart at number twenty-two. This remained their lowest charting single until "What Are You Waiting For" charted at number thirty-eight in 2014.

Track listing

Charts and certifications

Weekly charts

Year-end charts

Certifications

References 

2008 debut albums
The Saturdays albums
Albums produced by Cutfather
Fascination Records albums